Legend Quest (released in Latin America as Las Leyendas) is a Mexican animated fantasy comedy-horror streaming television series created for Netflix produced by Ánima Estudios. It is based on the characters created by Mexican animator Ricardo Arnaiz, and is part of the Leyendas animated franchise. This is the streaming network's first original animated series produced in Latin America.

It premiered worldwide on Netflix on February 24, 2017. The series was renewed for a second season which premiered on October 5, 2019, titled Legend Quest: Masters of Myth.

In 2019, CAKE picked up the distribution rights for the series.

Plot 
When a gifted teen Leo San Juan, and the inhabitants of his Mexican village are attacked by a host of otherworldly creatures, Leo's ghostly friends Teodora, Don Andres and Alebrije join him in a quest to foil an evil overlord who plans to eradicate mankind from the annals of history. They are aided in their mission by a band of powerful allies—an assortment of legendary creatures from around the world.

Cast

English version 
Johnny Rose as Leonardo "Leo" San Juan, a 14-year-old boy who is Marcella's boyfriend, and leader of the group. He has the ability to see and speak with ghosts. He is described as being brave, resourceful, honest, and noble of heart. Prior to the encountering evil forces that threaten to destroy the world, he lived in a small Mexican village with his grandmother. In the first episode, he learns that he is destined to be the hero of whom it was foretold: "The Lion will destroy the Serpent." Though he at first refuses to accept his destined role so he can live a normal life, Leo soon embraces himself as a true hero. Leo later also starts to realize Teodora's romantic feelings toward him.
Oscar Cheda as Don Andrés, the ghost of an old Conquistador; he claims to have been a barber in his corporeal life. His insistence that his former occupation makes him qualified to dispense opinions on medical issues becomes a running gag. Despite being a ghost, he often fears for his safety.
Annemarie Blanco as Teodora, the ghost of a 17-year-old girl who actually hails from the future, as shown by her modern attire and mobile phone, which contrast with the show's 19th-century setting. It is later revealed that she is not actually dead but rather comatose due to injuries sustained in a truck accident; a mysterious lady subsequently taught her the power of astral projection and advised her that Leo would need her help, prompting Teodora to send herself back through time. Consequently, Teodora possesses some abilities that normal ghosts lack, such as immunity to the power of Medusa and greater skill at manipulating physical objects. She also has a rather fierce rivalry with Marcella. Despite that,she was willing to resuscitate Marcella when she died, possessing her body to perform CPR on herself. Teodora can seem rather selfish and hard-headed at times, but in reality she is a caring, brave, and kind-hearted girl who is willing to risk it all to protect her friends, particularly Leo. In the second season, it's revealed Teodora has gradually been falling in love with Leo, attracted to his bravery and desire to help those in need.
Paul Tei as Alebrije, a flamboyant, kindhearted yet dimwitted strange creature of various colors who appears in different forms depending on the observer, though always retaining his unique color scheme. His real name is apparently hard to pronounce, so he is simply nicknamed Alebrije by the group. He is portrayed quite differently compared to the films in terms of appearance and personality. Alebrije is portrayed as a comical optimistic character who tries to keep the team together, while also presenting his own knowledge when needed. 
Cydney J. Fam (Season 1); Jenna Lamia (Season 2) as Marcella, an extremely beautiful 16-year-old girl, and Leo's new girlfriend who comes from a family who are accused of being sorcerers. It is eventually revealed that her mother was indeed a sorceress, but one who refused to aid Baba Yaga and Nu Gui in their plans and was thus attacked and left gravely injured; Marcella later inadvertently gained powers from her mother after touching her comatose form. Marcella took it upon herself to care for her mother, eventually coming to Leo's village. She eventually befriended Leo, later falling in love with him and having their first kiss.
Blanca Bassion as Baba Yaga, an evil witch who initially appears to be in league with Quetzalcoatl but is later revealed to have been enslaved by him; she seeks freedom and vengeance on her "master." She and her comrade Nu Gui attempted to persuade Marcella's mother to join them in their plotting
Paul Tei as Friar Godofredo, a Friar who mentored Leo and later informs him of the existence of the Brotherhood, a noble organization dedicated to fighting evils such as Quetzalcoatl.
Al-Kesne Shaw as Quetzalcoatl, a legendary deity who is described as a force of creation "when he's in a good mood"; he is the series' main antagonist and seeks to destroy the world so that he can remake it. Previously he did so for humanity's benefit, but was then trapped in an alternate dimension, leading him to seek vengeance. He later tricks the heroes in attempting to destroy the Esfera, an egg containing the next Quetzalcoatl, in order to prevent his own demise.
Lissa Grossman as Abuelita, Leo's grandmother.
Andrio Chaverra as Thomas Decatur, a New Jersey inventor who becomes one of Leo's allies.
Gerald Owens as Fenrir, the legendary wolf of Norse mythology who seeks to bring about Ragnarok; he is Quetzalcoatl's ancient rival and seeks to destroy him. He is chained to the world tree Yggdrasil and guards access to it, as it serves to connect all points of space and time.
Owen Almeida as Akihito, a young Japanese nobleman who is heir to both the magical Sword of Dawn and leadership of the Brotherhood, a noble organization dedicated to thwarting mystical menaces such as Quetzalcoatl. Initially leading a sheltered life that led to his own people despising him, Akihito found the courage to take up his family sword with help from Marcella. The sword enables Akihito to undergo a transformation similar to that of Ultraman, in which he dons a mystical suit of armor and grows to gigantic size.
Paula Barros as Nu Gui, a Chinese witch and member of Baba Yaga's coven; she was once the daughter of an Emperor, but betrayed him in order to obtain immortality, though the process drove her mad. She is initially contemptuous of Yaga for siding with Quetzalcoatl, but later joins him in Baba Yaga's place; however, like Yaga it is revealed that she serves unwillingly. Barros also provides the voices of Teodora's Mom, Teodora's cellphone, and Akihito's overprotective Vizier.

Spanish version 
Benny Emmanuel as Leonardo "Leo" San Juan
Mayté Cordeiro as Teodora
Andrés Couturier as Don Andrés
Ricardo O'Farrill as Alebrije

Episodes

Season 1 (2017)
The season consists of 13 episodes, all of which were released on February 24, 2017.

Season 2 (2019)
The season consists of 13 episodes, all of which were released on October 5, 2019.

Development 
The series was first announced when Variety reported that a new series based on the Leyendas franchise is being developed for Netflix. "We approached Netflix and knew that the trilogy had been successful in Mexico and Latin America, but we dared to propose to do something much more global and they loved the idea," said executive producer Jose C. Garcia de Letona. Negotiations between Netflix and Ánima Estudios have begun in October 2015. Co-executive producer Fernando de Fuentes was happy with the partnership with the streaming network after the growth of the Mexican animation industry. "We have already worked 15 years in the industry and we are happy to see our work on the Netflix platform, which has collaborated with large companies, and has included Ánima [which] makes us proud," said Fuentes. Fuentes also said that the show is "an important leap" for the franchise and production company Ánima Estudios.

Release 
The series premiered on Netflix on February 24, 2017, worldwide in 190 countries and translated into 24 to 30 languages. Producers Fernando de Fuentes and Jose C. Garcia de Letona thought the decision to release the show worldwide in multiple languages is necessary since the country of Mexico, where the show is produced and set, has been receiving more global attention. "The world is talking about Mexico and we are lucky in that sense to be able to talk about our country and its relationship with other nations[,] even if it is through cartoons," said Fernando de Fuentes.

Reception

Critical response 
The show received a favorable review. Emily Ashby of Common Sense Media gave the series a 4 star rating and said that "the enjoyable show's roots in Mexican folklore is an original concept and could inspire kids' interest in related topics."

Accolades

Hispanic impact 
The show has been praised for its positive impact towards the Hispanic culture, which makes numerous nods to the history of Mexico and folklore, as well as the series' worthy educational values, teaching younger Hispanic viewers about the importance of their Mexican roots.

See also 
Ánima Estudios
La Leyenda de la Nahuala
La Leyenda de la Llorona
La Leyenda de las Momias
La Leyenda del Chupacabras
La Leyenda del Charro Negro
Las Leyendas: El Origen

References

External links 
  at Netflix
 

2010s Mexican television series
2010s animated television series
2017 Mexican television series debuts
Mexican children's animated adventure television series
Mexican children's animated comedy television series
Mexican children's animated fantasy television series
Mexican children's animated action television series
Mexican children's animated science fiction television series
Mexican children's animated horror television series
Mexican flash animated television series
Ánima Estudios television series
Spanish-language Netflix original programming
Netflix children's programming
Animated television series by Netflix
Anime-influenced Western animated television series
English-language Netflix original programming
Television series set in the 1810s
Teen animated television series